Dimosthenis "Dimos" Manglaras (born 3 June 1940, in Katerini) is a former Greek long jumper.

At the 1960 Summer Olympics in Rome he ranked 11th, and at the 1964 Summer Olympics in Tokyo he didn't pass the qualification.

His personal bests are 7.74 m outdoors (25 July 1964, in Cairo) and 7.24 m indoors (27 March 1966, in Dortmund).

External links 
 Profile at SEGAS

Greek male long jumpers
Olympic athletes of Greece
1940 births
Living people
Athletes (track and field) at the 1960 Summer Olympics
Athletes (track and field) at the 1964 Summer Olympics
Mediterranean Games silver medalists for Greece
Mediterranean Games medalists in athletics
Athletes (track and field) at the 1959 Mediterranean Games
Sportspeople from Katerini
20th-century Greek people